Romances Tour was a concert tour performed by Luis Miguel during the years 1997 and 1998 to promote his new album Romances. To present this album, two press conferences were held, one at the Rainbow Room in New York City and another at the Casino de Madrid, Spain.

On this tour, Luis Miguel perform his last back-catalogue and also his last pop songs. Pollstar mentioned this tour as one of the Top 20 All-Time Grossing, and one of the 20 artists that most tickets have sold in one same scenario in the history of the music. The tour consisted of 79 concerts and was attended by approximately 1 million fans.

History 

This tour began in September in United States where he made a total of 9 concerts in Las Vegas and Los Angeles.

Then in October he began his concert season in Mexico, specifically in Monterrey and Mexico City.

In November he travels to South America (Argentina and Chile) then to Puerto Rico and then begins an extensive series of concerts by United States in the following cities: Orlando, Miami, San Antonio, El Paso, San Diego, Tucson, Houston, South Padre, New York, Rosemont, Fairfax, Atlantic City, Anaheim, Los Angeles, Phoenix, San Jose, Sacramento and Las Vegas for a total of 32 concerts.

Then in the month of May close the tour in Spain (country to which returns after 6 years of absence since its presentation at the Seville Expo '92) with 9 concerts.

Critical reception
The performances featured Miguel performing dance-pop and bolero arrangements for two-and-a-half hours.  Adam Sandler of Variety expressed a mixed reaction to the concert in the Universal Amphitheatre in Los Angeles. He noted that Miguel rarely acknowledged his audience or ventured out from center stage. Robert Hilburn of the Los Angeles Times had a more positive reaction, which he described as a "marvelously designed and wonderfully executed blend of Latin music tradition". Another Times contributor, Ernesto Lechner, wrote that Miguel's bolero performance at the Arrowhead Pond arena in California "brought the house down" and stated that the experience at the concert was "pretty close" to Beatlemania. In New York City, Miguel performed five consecutive shows in the Radio City Music Hall. In Mexico City he performed seventeen consecutive concerts in the National Auditorium, where it was the highest-grossing concert by a Latin artist that year. The tour also traveled to South America; including Chile, and Argentina; and continued until May 1998, when Miguel performed throughout Spain. Miguel was the first Latin artist to be inducted to the Pollstar "Top 20 All-Time Grossing Tours" for most tickets sold for consecutive concerts at one venue in 1997.

Set List 
This set list is from the September 12, 1997, concert in Las Vegas. It does not represent all dates throughout the tour.

 "Si Te Vas"
 "Que Tú Te Vas"
 Up-tempo Medley:
"Un Hombre Busca Una Mujer" 
"Cuestión De Piel" 
"Oro De Ley"
 Ballads Medley:
"Yo Que No Vivo Sin Ti"
"Amante Del Amor" 
"Culpable O No" 
"Mas Allá de Todo"
"Fría Como el Viento"
"Entrégate" 
"Tengo Todo Excepto a Ti"
"Hoy El Aire Huele A Ti"
"La Incondicional"
 "Todo Por Su Amor"
 "Tú y Yo"
 "Voy a Apagar la Luz / Contigo Aprendí"
 "La Gloria Eres Tú"
 "Encadenados"
 "El Reloj"
 "De Quererte Así"
 "Somos Novios"
 "Sabor a Mí"
 "El Día Que Me Quieras"
 "Uno"
 "Inolvidable"
 "No Sé Tú"
 "Por Debajo de la Mesa"
 "Nosotros"
 "Bésame Mucho"
 "La Media Vuelta"
 "Y"
 "Que Seas Feliz"
 "Échame A Mí La Culpa"
 "Mi Ciudad"
 "La Bikina"
 "Sueña"
 "Dame"
 "Suave"
Encore
"Como Es Posible Que A Mi Lado" 
 "Será Que No Me Amas"
 "Cuando Calienta El Sol"

Tour dates

The second Santiago show was partially recorded for its transmission in Chile by UC13.*
The second Buenos Aires show was partially recorded for its transmission in Argentina by Canal 13.

Cancelled shows

Band

 Luis Miguel - Vocals
 Kiko Cibrian - Guitar (1997)
 Todd Robinson - Guitar (1998)
 Francisco Loyo - Piano, Keyboards
 Victor Loyo - Drums
 Gerardo Carrillo - Bass
 Tommy Aros - Percussion
 Arturo Pérez - Keyboards
 Jeff Nathanson - Saxophone
 Francisco Abonce - Trumpet
 Juan Arpero - Trumpet
 Alejandro Carballo - Trombone
 Antonio González - Requinto
 Shana Wall - Backing Vocals (1997)
 Francis Benitez - Backing Vocals (1997)
 Sara LaPorte - Backing Vocals (1997)
 Alice - Backing Vocals (1998)
 Unique - Backing Vocals (1998)

Source.

Notes

References

Luis Miguel concert tours
1997 concert tours
1998 concert tours

pt:Romances Tour